Bryan Müller, known as Skee Mask, is an electronic music producer from Munich, Germany. His 2018 album, Compro, was named "Best New Music" by Pitchfork.

Discography

Albums
Shred (Ilian Tape, 2016)
Compro (Ilian Tape, 2018)
Pool (Ilian Tape, 2021)
A (Self released, 2022)
B (Self released, 2022)

References

German electronic musicians
Year of birth missing (living people)
Living people
Intelligent dance musicians